Bahadur Singh may refer to:

Bahadur Singh Bundi, ruler of princely state of Bundi
Bahadur Singh Sagoo, Indian shotputter
Bahadur Singh Chouhan, Indian athlete
Bahadur Singh Baral, Nepalese military officer in British Indian Army
Bahadur Singh Bohra, Indian army personnel and recipient of Ashok Chakra
Bahadur Singh Dhakad, Indian politician
Bahadur Singh, an Indian comic character and hero of  Bahadur (comics), generally referred to as Bahadur
Bahadur Singh Bhatnagar (19th century), compiler of the encyclopedia Yadgar-i-Bahaduri